Dao Lang (刀郎) may refer to:

 Dolan people or Dao Lang (in Chinese), name of a people or region of what is now Xinjiang Province, China
 Dao Lang (singer), pseudonym for Luo Lin (罗林), a Chinese singer